Vasudeva Perumal Temple is a Hindu temple in the village of Kadagambadi in the Tiruvarur district of Tamil Nadu, India. The temple is dedicated to Vishnu.

Significance 

Constructed by a Chola king, the temple is situated on the banks of the Arasalar River and has a shrine to Hanuman. The main idol of Vasudeva Perumal is flanked by his consorts Sridevi and Bhudevi.

References 

 

Vishnu temples in Tiruvarur district
Vishnu temples